Lars Jakob Vilhelm Burman, born April 1, 1958, is a Swedish professor of Literature at Uppsala University, director of Uppsala University Library, and inspector at Värmlands nation.

He is married to the author Carina Burman.

Bibliography 
 (2015). Sju oroande perspektiv: Om biblioteksutvecklingen vid universitet och högskolor. Ingår i Lars-Gunnar Larsson (red.) Kungl. Vetenskapssamhällets i Uppsala årsbok 40/2013-2014, Uppsala: Kungl. Vetenskapssamhället i Uppsala. 53-69
 (2015). Skogekär Bergbo, Venerid, under redaktion av Lars Burman och med inledning av Horace Engdahl
 (2014). Med fjädern från en kerubs vinge: Studenten Erland Hofstens passionsepos "Ett Rimm" (1677). Textutgåva med inledning och förklaringar.
 (2013). Lärt gräl: Fredmans Sång N:o 28 och 1700-talets disputationskultur. Tidskrift för litteraturvetenskap, 5-15
 (2012). Eloquent Students: Rhetorical Practices at the Uppsala Student Nations 1663-2010. [Swedish translation 2013]
 (2008). Att förvalta sitt pund: om kulturarv och kulturarvsstrategier vid Uppsala universitet.
 (1998). Tre fruar och en mamsell: om C. J. L. Almqvists tidiga 1840-talsromaner
 (1990). Den svenska stormaktstidens sonett. Dissertation

References

External links
 Official page at the University of Uppsala

1958 births
Living people
Academic staff of Uppsala University
Swedish writers
Members of the Royal Society of Sciences in Uppsala